The 2017 Denver Outlaws season was the twelfth season for the Denver Outlaws of Major League Lacrosse. The Outlaws come into the 2017 season as defending MLL champions after defeating the Ohio Machine in the 2016 final, 19-18. After losing in their first four Steinfeld Cup appearances, the Outlaws have won two championships in the past three seasons. Despite winning the title in 2016, the Outlaws had to rattle off six straight wins at the end of the regular season just to finish tied atop the standings at 8-6 with six other teams. Due to tiebreaker procedures, the Outlaws were rewarded the third seed in the postseason.

On August 5, thanks to an Ohio loss to Rochester in the last week of the regular season, the Outlaws clinched the top spot in the postseason with a 9-5 record. On August 19, the Outlaws played in their MLL-record seventh league championship game, but lost to the Machine 17-12.

Schedule

Regular season

Postseason

Standings

References

External links
 Team Website 

Denver Outlaws seasons
Denver Outlaws
2017 in sports in Colorado